Two ships of the United States Navy have been named USS Prairie, after the grassland prairie.
 The first  was an auxiliary cruiser purchased in 1898 for the Spanish–American War, and in periodic service until sold in 1923.
 The second  was a destroyer tender in service from 1940 to 1993.

United States Navy ship names